The 1971 UC Riverside Highlanders football team represented the University of California, Riverside as a member of the California Collegiate Athletic Association (CCAA) during the 1971 NCAA College Division football season. Led by Gary Knecht in his second and final season as head coach, UC Riverside compiled an overall record of 2–7–1 with a mark of record of 0–2 in conference play, placing last out of five teams in the CCAA. The team was outscored by its opponents 256 to 120 for the season. The Highlanders played home games at Highlander Stadium in Riverside, California.

Knecht finished his tenure at UC Riverside with an overall record of 6–13–1, for a .325 winning percentage.

Schedule

References

UC Riverside
UC Riverside Highlanders football seasons
UC Riverside Highlanders football